Ololygon argyreornatus, commonly known as the Rio Mutum snouted treefrog, is a species of frog in the family Hylidae endemic to Brazil. Its natural habitats are subtropical or tropical moist lowland forests, subtropical or tropical moist montane forests, subtropical or tropical moist shrubland, freshwater marshes, intermittent freshwater marshes, and heavily degraded former forests.
It is threatened by habitat loss.

References

argyreornatus
Endemic fauna of Brazil
Amphibians of Brazil
Amphibians described in 1926
Taxa named by Alípio de Miranda-Ribeiro
Taxonomy articles created by Polbot
Taxobox binomials not recognized by IUCN